The Communist Party of Germany (KPD ) was a major political party in the Weimar Republic between 1918 and 1933, an underground resistance movement in Nazi Germany, and a minor party in West Germany in the postwar period until it was banned by the Federal Constitutional Court in 1956.

Founded in the aftermath of the First World War by socialists who had opposed the war, the party joined the Spartacist uprising of January 1919, which sought to establish a soviet republic in Germany. After the defeat of the uprising, and the murder of KPD leaders Rosa Luxemburg, Karl Liebknecht and Leo Jogiches, the party temporarily steered a more moderate, parliamentarian course under the leadership of Paul Levi. During the Weimar Republic period, the KPD usually polled between 10 and 15 percent of the vote and was represented in the national  and in state parliaments. Under the leadership of Ernst Thälmann from 1925 the party became thoroughly Stalinist and loyal to the leadership of the Soviet Union, and from 1928 it was largely controlled and funded by the Comintern in Moscow. Under Thälmann's leadership the party directed most of its attacks against the Social Democratic Party of Germany, which it regarded as its main adversary and referred to as "social fascists"; the KPD considered all other parties in the Weimar Republic to be "fascists".

The KPD was banned in the Weimar Republic one day after the Nazi Party emerged triumphant in the German elections in 1933. It maintained an underground organization in Nazi Germany, and the KPD and groups associated with it led the internal resistance to the Nazi regime, with a focus on distributing anti-Nazi literature. The KPD suffered heavy losses between 1933 and 1939, with 30,000 communists executed and 150,000 sent to Nazi concentration camps.

The party was revived in divided postwar West and East Germany and won seats in the first  (West German Parliament) elections in 1949, but its support collapsed following the establishment of the German Democratic Republic in the former Soviet Occupation Zone in the east. The KPD was banned as extremist in West Germany in 1956 by the Federal Constitutional Court. In 1969, some of its former members founded an even smaller fringe party, the German Communist Party (DKP), which remains legal, and multiple tiny splinter groups claiming to be the successor to the KPD have also subsequently been formed.

In East Germany, the party was merged, by Soviet decree, with remnants of the Social Democratic Party to form the Socialist Unity Party (SED) which ruled East Germany from 1949 until 1989–1990; the merger was opposed by many Social Democrats, many of whom fled to the western zones. After the fall of the Berlin Wall, reformists took over the SED and renamed it the Party of Democratic Socialism (PDS); in 2007 the PDS subsequently merged with the SPD splinter faction WASG to form .

Early history

Before the First World War the Social Democratic Party (SPD) was the largest party in Germany and the world's most successful socialist party. Although still officially claiming to be a Marxist party, by 1914 it had become in practice a reformist party. In 1914 the SPD members of the Reichstag voted in favour of the war. Left-wing members of the party, led by Karl Liebknecht and Rosa Luxemburg, strongly opposed the war, and the SPD soon suffered a split. From the split emerged the Independent Social Democratic Party of Germany (USPD) and the more radical Spartacist League; the latter formed the core of what would become the KPD. In November 1918, revolution broke out across Germany. The KPD held its founding congress in Berlin from 30 December 1918 to 1 January 1919, in the reception hall of the City Council. Rosa Luxemburg was initially against the setting up of a new party but joined the KPD after her initial hesitation. Apart from the Spartacists, another dissent group of socialists called the International Communists of Germany, also dissenting members of the Social Democratic party but mainly located in Hamburg, Bremen and Northern Germany, joined the KPD. The Revolutionary Shop Stewards, a network of dissenting socialist trade unionists centered in Berlin, were also invited to the congress, but ultimately did not join the KPD because they deemed the founding congress too syndicalist-leaning.

There were seven main reports given at the founding congress:
 "Economical Struggles" – by Paul Lange
 Greeting speech – by Karl Radek
 "International Conferences" – by Hermann Duncker
 "Our Organization" – by Hugo Eberlein
 "Our Program" – by Rosa Luxemburg
 "The Crisis of the USPD" – by Karl Liebknecht
 "The National Assembly" – by Paul Levi

These reports were given by leading figures of the Spartacist League, but members of the International Communists of Germany also took part in the discussions.

Under the leadership of Liebknecht and Luxemburg, the KPD was committed to a revolution in Germany, and attempts to bring down the interim government and create a revolutionary situation continued during 1919 and 1920. Germany's SPD leadership, which had come to power after the fall of the monarchy, was vehemently opposed to a socialist revolution. With the new regime terrified of a Bolshevik Revolution in Germany, Defense Minister Gustav Noske recruited former right-wing military officers and demobilized veterans and formed various Freikorps and anti-communist paramilitaries to violently suppress all revolutionary activity. During the failed Spartacist uprising in Berlin of January 1919, Liebknecht and Luxemburg, who had not initiated the uprising but joined once it had begun, were captured by the Freikorps and murdered. At its peak, the party had 350–400,000 members in 1920. The party split a few months later into two factions, the KPD and the much smaller Communist Workers Party of Germany (KAPD).

Following the assassination of Leo Jogiches, Paul Levi became the KPD's leader. Other prominent members included Clara Zetkin, Paul Frölich, Hugo Eberlein, Franz Mehring, August Thalheimer, Wilhelm Pieck and Ernst Meyer. Levi led the party away from the policy of immediate revolution, in an effort to win over SPD and USPD voters and trade union officials. These efforts were rewarded when a substantial section of the USPD joined the KPD, making it a mass party for the first time.

Weimar Republic years

Through the 1920s the KPD was racked by internal conflict between radical and moderate factions, partly reflecting the power struggles between Joseph Stalin and Grigory Zinoviev in Moscow. Germany was seen as being of central importance to the struggle for socialism, and the failure of the German revolution was a major setback. Eventually Levi was expelled in 1921 by the Comintern for "indiscipline". Further leadership changes took place in the 1920s. Supporters of the Left or Right Opposition to the Stalinist-controlled Comintern leadership were expelled; of these, Heinrich Brandler, August Thalheimer and Paul Frölich set up a splinter Communist Party Opposition in 1928.

During the years of the Weimar Republic, the KPD was the largest communist party in Europe and seen as the "leading party" of the communist movement outside of the Soviet Union. The party abandoned the goal of immediate revolution, and from 1924 onwards contested Reichstag elections, with some success.

Fischer and Thälmann leaderships and the united front

A new KPD leadership more favorable to the Soviet Union was elected in 1923. The party’s left around Ruth Fischer, Arkadi Maslow and Werner Scholem took leadership of the KPD in 1924; Ernst Thälmann was allied to this faction and became a member of the politburo and was appointed
KPD vice-chairman in January 1924. Stalin engineered the Fischer leadership's removal in August 1925, and installed Thälmann as party chairman.

From 1923 to 1928, the KPD broadly followed the united front policy developed in the early 1920s of working with other working class and socialist parties to contest elections, pursue social struggles and fight the rising right-wing militias. For example, in October 1923 the KPD formed a coalition government with the SPD in the states of Saxony and Thuringia. However, the Reichswehr legally overthrew these governments by force, through a constitutional process called Reichsexekution. In 1926 the KPD worked with the SPD on a referendum to expropriate the German nobility, together mobilising 14.4 million voters.

The party's first paramilitary wing was the Roter Frontkämpferbund (Alliance of Red Front Fighters), which was founded in 1924 but banned by the governing Social Democrats in 1929.

By 1927, the party had 130,000 members, of whom 40,000 had been members in 1920. From 1928 onwards (after Stalin reinstated Thälmann as KPD leader against the majority of the KPD central committee in the wake of an embezzlement scandal involving Thälmann's ally John Wittorf), the party followed the Comintern line and received funding from the Comintern.  Under Thälmann's leadership, the party was closely aligned with the Soviet leadership headed by Joseph Stalin; Thälmann has been described as "the driving force behind Stalinization in the mid to late 1920s" and "Stalin’s right hand in Germany". After winning control from his former leftist allies, he expelled the party's Right Opposition around Heinrich Brandler.

The Third Period and "social fascism"
Aligning with the Comintern's ultra-left Third Period, under the slogan "Class against class", the KPD abruptly turned to viewing the Social Democratic Party of Germany (SPD) as its main adversary. In this period, the KPD referred to the SPD as "social fascists". The term social fascism was introduced to the German Communist Party shortly after the Hamburg Uprising of 1923 and gradually became ever more influential in the party; by 1929 it was being propagated as a theory. The KPD regarded itself as "the only anti-fascist party" in Germany and held that all other parties in the Weimar Republic were "fascist". After the Nazi electoral breakthrough in the 1930 Reichstag election, the SPD proposed a renewed united front with the KPD against fascism but this was rejected.

In the early 1930s, the KPD cooperated with the Nazis in attacking the social democrats, and both sought to destroy the liberal democracy of the Weimar Republic. They also followed an increasingly nationalist course, trying to appeal to nationalist-leaning workers.  

The KPD leadership initially first criticised but then supported the 1931 Prussian Landtag referendum, an unsuccessful attempt launched by the far-right Stahlhelm to bring down the social democrat state government of Prussia by means of a plebiscite; the KPD referred to the SA as "working people's comrades" during this campaign.

The KPD maintained a solid electoral performance, usually polling more than 10% of the vote. It gained 100 deputies in the November 1932 elections, getting 16% of the vote and coming third. In the presidential election of the same year, its candidate Thälmann took 13.2% of the vote, compared to Hitler's 30.1%. In this period, while also opposed to the Nazis, the KPD regarded the Nazi Party as a less sophisticated and thus less dangerous fascist party than the SPD, and KPD leader Ernst Thälmann declared that "some Nazi trees must not be allowed to overshadow a forest [of social democrats]". In February 1932, Thälmann argued that “Hitler must come to power first, then the requirements for a revolutionary crisis [will] arrive more quickly”. In November 1932, the KPD and the Nazis worked together in the Berlin transport workers’ strike.

Critics of the KPD accused it of having pursued a sectarian policy. For example, the Social Democratic Party criticized the KPD's thesis of "social fascism", and both Leon Trotsky from the Comintern's Left Opposition and August Thalheimer of the Right Opposition continued to argue for a united front. Critics believed that the KPD's sectarianism scuttled any possibility of a united front with the SPD against the rising power of the National Socialists.

Thälmann claimed that the right-wing leadership of the SPD rejected and actively worked against the KPD's efforts to form a united front against fascism. After Franz von Papen's government carried out a coup d'état in Prussia the KPD called for a general strike and turned to the SPD leadership for joint struggle, but the SPD leaders again refused to cooperate with the KPD.

In 1932, as the party began to shift focus to the fascist threat, the KPD founded the Antifaschistische Aktion, commonly known as Antifa, which it described as a "red united front under the leadership of the only anti-fascist party, the KPD". In February 1933, shortly before the end of the Weimar Republic, the KPD proposed a coalition with the SPD against Nazism, which the SPD rejected.

Nazi era
On 27 February, soon after the appointment of Adolf Hitler as chancellor, the Reichstag was set on fire and Dutch council communist Marinus van der Lubbe was found near the building. The Nazis publicly blamed the fire on communist agitators in general, although in a German court in 1933, it was decided that van der Lubbe had acted alone, as he claimed to have done. The following day, Hitler persuaded Hindenburg to issue the Reichstag Fire Decree. It suspended the civil liberties enshrined in the Weimar Constitution, ostensibly to deal with Communist acts of violence.

Repression began within hours of the fire, when police arrested dozens of communists. Although Hitler could have formally banned the KPD, he did not do so right away. Not only was he reluctant to chance a violent uprising, but he believed the KPD could siphon off SPD votes and split the left. However, most judges held the KPD responsible for the fire, and took the line that KPD membership was in and of itself a treasonous act. At the March 1933 election, the KPD elected 81 deputies. However, it was an open secret that they would never be allowed to take up their seats; they were all arrested in short order. For all intents and purposes, the KPD was "outlawed" on the day the Reichstag Fire Decree was issued, and "completely banned" as of 6 March, the day after the election.

Shortly after the election, the Nazis pushed through the Enabling Act, which allowed the cabinet–in practice, Hitler–to enact laws without the involvement of the Reichstag, effectively giving Hitler dictatorial powers. Since the bill was effectively a constitutional amendment, a quorum of two-thirds of the entire Reichstag had to be present in order to formally call up the bill. Leaving nothing to chance, Reichstag President Hermann Göring did not count the KPD seats for purposes of obtaining the required quorum. This led historian Richard J. Evans to contend that the Enabling Act had been passed in a manner contrary to law. The Nazis did not need to count the KPD deputies for purposes of getting a supermajority of two-thirds of those deputies present and voting. However, Evans argued, not counting the KPD deputies for purposes of a quorum amounted to "refusing to recognize their existence", and was thus "an illegal act".

The KPD was efficiently suppressed by the Nazis. The most senior KPD leaders were Wilhelm Pieck and Walter Ulbricht, who went into exile in the Soviet Union. The KPD maintained an underground organisation in Germany throughout the Nazi period, but the loss of many core members severely weakened the Party's infrastructure.

KPD leaders purged by Stalin
A number of senior KPD leaders in exile were caught up in Joseph Stalin's Great Purge of 1937–1938 and executed, among them Hugo Eberlein, Heinz Neumann, Hermann Remmele, Fritz Schulte and Hermann Schubert, or sent to the gulag, like Margarete Buber-Neumann. Still others, like Gustav von Wangenheim and Erich Mielke (later the head of the Stasi in East Germany), denounced their fellow exiles to the NKVD.

Post-war history
In East Germany, the Soviet Military Administration in Germany forced the eastern branch of the SPD to merge with the KPD (led by Pieck and Ulbricht) to form the Socialist Unity Party (SED) in April 1946. Although nominally a union of equals, the SED quickly fell under communist domination, and most of the more recalcitrant members from the SPD side of the merger were pushed out in short order. By the time of the formal formation of the East German state in 1949, the SED was a full-fledged Communist party, and developed along lines similar to other Soviet-bloc communist parties. It was the ruling party in East Germany from its formation in 1949 until 1989. The SPD managed to preserve its independence in Berlin, forcing the SED to form a small branch in West Berlin, the Socialist Unity Party of West Berlin.

The KPD reorganised in the western part of Germany, and received 5.7 percent of the vote in the first Bundestag election in 1949. But the onset of the Cold War and the subsequent widespread repression of the far-left soon caused a collapse in the party's support. The reputation of the party had also been damaged by the conduct of the Red Army during its occupation of eastern Germany, which included looting, political repression, and mass rape. On orders from Joseph Stalin, the Communist deputies to the Parlamentarischer Rat refused to sign the BRD Basic Law to avoid recognizing the political legitimacy of West Germany. At the 1953 election the KPD only won 2.2 percent of the total votes and lost all of its seats, never to return. The party was banned in August 1956 by the Federal Constitutional Court of Germany. The decision was upheld in 1957 by the European Commission of Human Rights in Communist Party of Germany v. the Federal Republic of Germany.

After the party was declared illegal, many of its members continued to function clandestinely despite increased government surveillance. Part of its membership refounded the party in 1968 as the German Communist Party (DKP). Following German reunification many DKP members joined the new Party of Democratic Socialism, formed out of the remains of the SED. In 1968, another self-described successor to the KPD was formed, the Communist Party of Germany/Marxists–Leninists (KPD/ML), which followed Maoist and later Hoxhaist ideas. It went through multiple splits and united with a Trotskyist group in 1986 to form the Unified Socialist Party (VSP), which failed to gain any influence and dissolved in the early 1990s. However, multiple tiny splinter groups originating from the KPD/ML still exist, several of which claim the name of KPD. Another party claiming the KPD name was formed in 1990 in East Berlin by several hardline communists who had been expelled from the PDS, including Erich Honecker. The KPD (Bolshevik) split off from the East German KPD in 2005, bringing the total number of active KPDs to at least five (more or less).

The Left, formed out of a merger between the PDS and Labour and Social Justice – The Electoral Alternative in 2007, claims to be the historical successor of the KPD (by way of the PDS).

Organization

In the early 1920s, the party operated under the principle of democratic centralism, whereby the leading body of the party was the Congress, meeting at least once a year. Between Congresses, leadership of the party resided in the Central Committee, which was elected at the Congress, of one group of people who had to live where the leadership was resident and formed the Zentrale and others nominated from the districts they represented (but also elected at the Congress) who represented the wider party. Elected figures were subject to recall by the bodies that elected them.

The KPD employed around about 200 full-timers during its early years of existence, and as Broue notes "They received the pay of an average skilled worker, and had no privileges, apart from being the first to be arrested, prosecuted and sentenced, and when shooting started, to be the first to fall".

Election results

Federal elections

Presidential elections

See also

 Communist Party Opposition
 Communist Workers' Party of Germany
 Freies Volk
 German resistance
 German Revolution of 1918–1919
 Hotel Lux, Moscow hotel where many German party members lived in exile
 Revolutionary Trade Union Opposition
 Rosa Luxemburg, Karl Liebknecht, Ernst Thälmann, Paul Levi, Erich Mielke, Richard Müller
 Roter Frontkämpferbund
 Socialist Workers' Party of Germany
 Sozialistische Volkszeitung
 Spartacus League
 Union of Manual and Intellectual Workers

References

Further reading
 Rudof Coper, Failure of a Revolution: Germany in 1918–1919. Cambridge, England: Cambridge University Press, 1955.
 Catherine Epstein, The Last Revolutionaries: German Communists and Their Century. Cambridge, Massachusetts: Harvard University Press, 2003.
 Ruth Fischer, Stalin and German Communism. Cambridge, Massachusetts: Harvard University Press, 1948.
 Ben Fowkes, Communism in Germany under the Weimar Republic; London: Palgrave Macmillan 1984.
 John Riddell (ed.), The German Revolution and the Debate on Soviet Power: Documents: 1918–1919: Preparing the Founding Congress. New York: Pathfinder Press, 1986.
 John Green, Willi Münzenberg – Fighter against Fascism and Stalinism, Routledge 2019
 Bill Pelz, The Spartakusbund and the German working class movement, 1914–1919, Lewiston [N.Y.]: E. Mellen Press, 1988.
 Aleksandr Vatlin, "The Testing Ground of World Revolution: Germany in the 1920s," in Tim Rees and Andrew Thorpe (eds.), International Communism and the Communist International, 1919–43. Manchester: Manchester University Press, 1998.
 Eric D. Weitz, Creating German Communism, 1890–1990: From Popular Protests to Socialist State. Princeton, NJ: Princeton University Press, 1997
 David Priestand, Red Flag: A History of Communism," New York: Grove Press, 2009
 Ralf Hoffrogge, Norman LaPorte (eds.): Weimar Communism as Mass Movement 1918–1933, London: Lawrence & Wishart.

 
Banned communist parties
German Revolution of 1918–1919
Defunct communist parties in Germany
Political parties established in 1918
1918 establishments in Germany
Political parties disestablished in 1933
1933 disestablishments in Germany
Political parties established in 1945
1945 establishments in Germany
Political parties disestablished in 1946
1946 disestablishments in Germany
Political parties disestablished in 1956
1956 disestablishments in West Germany
Far-left politics in Germany